Scelembiidae is a family of webspinners in the order Embioptera. There are about 16 genera and more than 40 described species in Scelembiidae.

Genera
These 16 genera belong to the family Scelembiidae:

 Ambonembia Ross, 2001
 Biguembia Szumik, 1997
 Conicercembia Ross, 1984
 Dolonembia Ross, 2001
 Ecuadembia Szumik, 2004
 Embolyntha Davis, 1940
 Gibocercus Szumik, 1997
 Litosembia Ross, 2001
 Malacosembia Ross, 2001
 Neorhagadochir Ross, 1944
 Ochrembia Ross, 2001
 Pachylembia Ross, 1984
 Pararhagadochir Davis, 1940
 Rhagadochir Enderlein, 1912
 Xiphosembia Ross, 2001
 † Kumarembia Engel & Grimaldi, 2011

References

Further reading

 
 
 
 

Embioptera
Insect families